Eugenia Benbow Sheppard (July 24, 1899 – November 11, 1984) was an American fashion writer and newspaper columnist for some 80 newspapers (including the Columbus Dispatch, New York Post, The Boston Post, and most notably, the New York Herald Tribune.

Early life and education
Sheppard was born in Nelsonville, Ohio, the daughter of James Taylor Sheppard and Jane Benbow Sheppard. She graduated from Bryn Mawr College in 1921.

Career 
She was credited with having "revolutionized fashion reporting with her reports in the New York Herald Tribune (1940–56)". Her syndicated column, Inside Fashion, made her the most influential fashion arbiter of the 1950s and 1960s. Her fashion columns at the New York Herald Tribune carried Joe Eula's illustrations.

Sheppard wrote a children's play, Cinderella (1928). She also collaborated with Earl Blackwell on writing two novels, Crystal Clear (1978) and Skyrocket (1980), both set in the fashion world.

Personal life and legacy 
Sheppard married three times. Her first two marriages, to Samuel Black and Preston Wolfe, ended in divorce. She married her third husband, fellow journalist Walter Millis, in 1944; he died in 1968. She died from cancer in 1984, aged 85 years, in New York City. She was survived by her son Sheppard Black, stepson Walter Millis, Jr., and stepdaughter Sarah Millis McCoy. Andy Warhol succinctly memorialized her in his diary entry of Monday, November 12, 1984, writing, "Oh and the day had started out with Eugenia Sheppard dying of cancer. She invented fashion and gossip together."

The Eugenia Sheppard Award for journalism has been given annually since 1987 by the Council of Fashion Designers of America.
Selected awardees include: André Leon Talley, Robin Givhan, and Cathy Horyn.

Quotes
 "It's all terribly cute, but like giving a girl candy when she craves steak." (on some designers' one-time predilection for buttons and bows)
 "Pretty sexy for a tall girl, but it may make a short one disappear altogether." (on a dress she was not crazy about)
 "Dessès has always been inspired by birds. I think it's time somebody came right out and told this nice guy to switch to biology or some other ology. Anything but birds." (On Jean Dessès' "dovetail look")
 "For the second time in history, women are in a dither about a young man, called Valentino. This time he is not a movie star, but a fashion designer from Rome." (In 1964 for the Boston Post about the designer Valentino)

References

1899 births
1984 deaths
American columnists
Deaths from cancer in New York (state)
American fashion journalists
Place of birth missing
American women columnists
20th-century American women writers
20th-century American non-fiction writers
Journalists from New York City
Bryn Mawr College alumni
People from Nelsonville, Ohio